XHHOS-FM is a radio station on 101.9 FM in Hermosillo, Sonora. It is owned by Uniradio and known as La Invasora with a grupera format.

History
XEHOS-AM 1540 received its concession on September 29, 1984. It was owned by Fernando Fernández Almada and broadcast with 5 kW day and 2 kW night. The current concessionaire acquired XEHOS in 1993 and raised its nighttime power to 5 kW.

XEHOS was approved to migrate to FM in 2011 but did not shut off its AM transmitter for another six years.

References

Radio stations in Sonora